Pervomaysky District may refer to:
Pyershamayski District (Pervomaysky District), a city district of Minsk, Belarus
Birinchi May District, Bishkek (Pervomaysky District), a city district of Bishkek, Kyrgyzstan
Pervomaysky District, Russia, several districts and city districts in Russia
Pervomaiske Raion (Pervomaysky District), a district of the Autonomous Republic of Crimea, Ukraine
Pervomaiskyi Raion, Kharkiv Oblast (Pervomaysky District), a former district of Kharkiv Oblast, Ukraine
Pervomaisk Raion (Pervomaysky District), a district of Mykolaiv Oblast, Ukraine